At least two ships of the Royal Netherlands Navy have been named HNLMS Urania after Urania, the muse of astronomy in Greek mythology:

 , was a training ship of the Royal Netherlands Navy, served from 1938 to 2001.
 , is a training ship of the Royal Netherlands Navy, entered service in 2004.

Royal Netherlands Navy ship names